Gabrielle Scawthorn is an Australian actress. She has appeared in numerous stage productions as well as TV and film. Gabrielle grew up in Ipswich, Queensland. She trained at NIDA.

Career

In 2015, Scawthorn created the role of Abbey in Christopher Harley's play Blood Bank at Ensemble Theatre The following year, she returned to Ensemble Theatre to perform in a production of Jane Caferella's e-baby, a two-hander play where she played the surrogate in a gestational surrogacy arrangement alongside Danielle Carter and directed by Nadia Tass. In a review for Stage Noise, critic Diana Simmonds said "Largely through Gabrielle Scawthorn’s vivid, vanity-free and characteristically intelligent performance, the humour scattered about the first half is well to the fore. It means that the transition to a more serious and potentially tragic second half (it’s about 90 minutes straight through) is effectively achieved." Carter and Gabrielle Scawthorn were described as bringing "such life to their roles" and being "utterly believable – in equal parts loveable and frustrating – [so that] the heartbreak, when it comes, is visceral. It was the Sydney premiere of the play, which had only previously been produced in Melbourne in 2015, and was Caferella's first full-length play.

In 2017 Gabrielle starred in the Sydney premiere of the Penelope Skinner play The Village Bike directed by Rachel Chant. Scawthorn was nominated for a Sydney Theatre Award for her performance. Sydney Morning Herald critic, Elissa Blake, wrote of her performance, "One of the most expressive actors around, Gabrielle Scawthorn, has impressed in every show I've seen her perform in. This play feels like a match for her talent."

In 2018 Scawthorn performed at Darlinghurst Theatre as The Angel of Death in The Sound Of Waiting by Mary Anne Butler. Later that year she performed with Sport For Jove Theatre Company in the world premiere of Ear To The Edge of time by Alana Valentine. That same year, Scawthorn played the role of Darja in the Australian premiere of Ironbound by Martyna Majok, for which she received her third Sydney Theatre Award nomination. Critic, John Shand, wrote of her performance, "Gabrielle Scawthorn has Darja's essence spilling off the bus-stop bench like it's raining verity and there's no roof beneath which to shelter."

In 2019 Scawthorn premiered the one woman show The Apologists at the VAULT Festival in London. Later that year she returned to Australia to perform in the role of Louise in Steve Martin's The Underpants at The Seymour Centre in Sydney.

In 2020 Scawthorn appeared in a return season of The Apologists at The Omnibus Theatre in London.

She's currently the host of the Back From Reality podcast investigating the world of reality television and the impact that it has on the lives of its participants. On the show, Gabrielle also regularly reflects on her own experience as runner up on Channel V's Fresh Meat at the age of seventeen. Podcast guests have included The Vixen (RuPaul's Drag Race), Amy Hart (Love Island), Belinda Chapple (Popstars), Fiona Falkiner (The Biggest Loser).

Gabrielle was also a writer, performer and founding member of the Australian sketch comedy group, 'I'm With Stupid' featuring Matthew Backer, Hugo Chiarella, Briallen Clarke, Paige Gardner and Tim Reuben. The group began producing online sketches in 2013 before being selected to produce sketches for the ABC TV/Screen Australia comedy initiative Fresh Blood. Their sketches were broadcast on ABC2 and ABC iView in 2014.

Personal life

Gabrielle is married to director and writer, Hugo Chiarella. She currently lives in London and travels between the UK and Australia for work.

Theatre credits

Awards and nominations

Filmography

References

External links 
Gabrielle Scawthorn on IMDb
Gabrielle Scawthorn on Australian Stage Database

Year of birth missing (living people)
Living people
21st-century Australian actresses
Australian Shakespearean actresses